Jackson Kinniburgh (born February 24, 2001) is a Canadian racing cyclist who currently rides for Cycling Canada. In 2021, he represented Canada at the UCI Track Cycling World Championships in the men's team pursuit event.

Major results

Road 
2019

Tour de L'Abitibi - Coupe des Nations Junior

 2nd  Stage 4 - Notre Dame du Nord

Track 
2019

UCI Junior Track Cycling World Championships

 4th Madison (with Riley Pickrell)
2020

UCI Track Cycling World Cup (Milton)

 3rd  Team Pursuit (with Amiel Flett-Brown, Sean Richardson, Evan Burtnik & Chris Ernst)

2021

Tissot UCI Track Cycling Nations Cup (Cali, Colombia)

 2nd  Team Pursuit (with Michael Foley, Ethan Ogrodniczuk, Sean Richardson & Mathias Guillemette)

UCI Track Cycling World Championships

 9th Team Pursuit (with Michael Foley, Ethan Ogrodniczuk & Derek Gee)

References 

2001 births
Living people
Canadian male cyclists
Sportspeople from Calgary
21st-century Canadian people